

37001–37100 

|-id=019
| 37019 Jordansteckloff ||  || Jordan Steckloff (born 1985) is a research scientist at the Planetary Science Institute who conducts modeling investigations into the physical processes at work on a variety of solar system bodies. || 
|-id=022
| 37022 Robertovittori ||  || Roberto Vittori  (born 1964), Italian astronaut || 
|-id=044
| 37044 Papymarcel ||  || Marcel Alphonse Merlin, father of French discoverer Jean-Claude Merlin. "Papy" is the French diminutive of "Father". || 
|}

37101–37200 

|-id=117
| 37117 Narcissus ||  || Narcissus, from Greek mythology, a hero from the territory of Thespiae in Boeotia who was renowned for his beauty || 
|-id=141
| 37141 Povolný ||  ||  (1924–2004), a Czech biologist and expert on butterflies and flies || 
|-id=163
| 37163 Huachucaclub ||  || The Huachuca Astronomy Club of Sierra Vista, Arizona, counts many amateur astronomers, including several discoverers of minor planets and comets as well as authors of books, articles and software (Src). || 
|}

37201–37300 

|-id=218
| 37218 Kimyoonyoung ||  || Yoonyoung Kim (born 1991) is a Korean postdoctoral researcher at the Max Planck Institute for Solar System Research (Göttingen, Germany), whose studies include characterization of dust properties of active asteroids and comets. || 
|-id=279
| 37279 Hukvaldy ||  || , a large castle in northeastern Moravia, Czech Republic (Src). || 
|}

37301–37400 

|-id=309
| 37309 Pajuelo ||  || Myriam Pajuelo (born 1961) is one of the first Peruvian planetary scientists. She obtained her PhD in France on studies of binary asteroids, and returned to Peru in 2017 to promote research in Planetary Sciences at the PUC-Peru. || 
|-id=349
| 37349 Lynnaequick ||  || Lynnae C. Quick (born 1984) of the NASA Goddard Space Flight Center is an expert in volcanic processes on planetary bodies, including study of the faculae and cryovolcanism on (1) Ceres. She is member of the Dawn, Europa Clipper, and Dragonfly missions. || 
|-id=391
| 37391 Ebre || 2001 XB || Ebre Observatory (Observatori de l'Ebre) in Roquetes-Tortosa, Spain. The observatory takes its name from a nearby river and was founded by the Jesuits in 1904. Since its establishment it has become very prestigious in geophysics. The observatory's centennial is being celebrated in 2004. || 
|-id=392
| 37392 Yukiniall ||  || Yuki and Niall, children of co-discoverer Henri Boffin || 
|}

37401–37500 

|-id=432
| 37432 Piszkéstető ||  || Piszkéstető, a 944 m peak on Mátra Mountains, Hungary, site of Piszkéstető Station || 
|-id=452
| 37452 Spirit || 4282 P-L || Spirit rover (Mars Exploration Rover A)† || 
|-id=471
| 37471 Popocatepetl || 7082 P-L || Popocatépetl, the 5462-m volcano in Mexico. || 
|}

37501–37600 

|-id=519
| 37519 Amphios || 3040 T-3 || Amphios, son of Merops of Perkote, one of the allies of Priam, killed by Ajax to get his beautiful armour during the Trojan war || 
|-id=530
| 37530 Dancingangel ||  || Ekaterina Pavlova (1991–2010), a talented and bright individual who devoted her short life to oriental dance. A two-time champion of oriental dancing in the Republic of Crimea, she also won numerous other competitions. The name "Dancingangel" reflects her spiritual qualities and professionalism. || 
|-id=556
| 37556 Svyaztie ||  || Svyaz and Tie, Russian and English words meaning "connection", honouring the astronomical collaborations and friendships between the two superpowers, and also the exchange of neckwear by the co-discoverers on their first meeting in 1970 || 
|-id=561
| 37561 Churgym || 1988 CR || Churgym River, a small Siberian river which forms a waterfall close to the site of the 1908 Tunguska explosion, which destroyed a large area of the Tundra forest. || 
|-id=573
| 37573 Enricocaruso ||  || Enrico Caruso (1873–1921), Italian tenor || 
|-id=582
| 37582 Faraday ||  || Michael Faraday (1791–1867), English naturalist, discoverer, amongst many things, of electromagnetic induction, diamagnetism, and the Faraday effect || 
|-id=583
| 37583 Ramonkhanna ||  || Ramon Khanna (born 1964), a German astrophysicist whose research includes black-hole magnetohydrodynamics || 
|-id=584
| 37584 Schleiden ||  || Matthias Jakob Schleiden (1804–1881), German botanist, co-founder (with Theodor Schwann) of the field of cytology || 
|-id=588
| 37588 Lynnecox ||  || Lynne Cox (born 1957), American long-distance swimmer || 
|-id=592
| 37592 Pauljackson ||  || Paul Jackson (born 1932), Professor emeritus at the Vienna Observatory || 
|-id=596
| 37596 Cotahuasi ||  || The Cotahuasi Canyon, near the Peruvian city of Arequipa, was formed by the Cotahuasi river. || 
|}

37601–37700 

|-
| 37601 Vicjen ||  || Vic Winter (born 1953) and Jen Winter (born 1969), popularizers of astronomy in rural Bolivia || 
|-id=607
| 37607 Regineolsen ||  || Regine Olsen (1822–1904), a Danish woman who was engaged to the Danish philosopher Søren Kierkegaard and who had a great influence upon his works. || 
|-id=608
| 37608 Löns ||  || Hermann Löns (1866–1914), German novelist and folk songwriter || 
|-id=609
| 37609 LaVelle ||  || Lewis LaVelle McCoy (born 1946), an American civic-minded entrepreneur from Arizona. || 
|-id=623
| 37623 Valmiera ||  || Valmiera (Wolmar), city in Northern Latvia || 
|-id=627
| 37627 Lucaparmitano || 1993 TD || Luca Parmitano (born 1976) is an Italian engineer and astronaut in the European Astronaut Corps for the European Space Agency. || 
|-id=630
| 37630 Thomasmore ||  || Thomas More (1478–1535), a philosopher, statesman and a noted Renaissance humanist. || 
|-id=640
| 37640 Luiginegrelli || 1993 WF || Luigi Negrelli (1799–1858) was an Italian engineer, known for his work on the Suez Canal. || 
|-id=645
| 37645 Chebarkul ||  || The city of Chebarkul where a large fragment the Chelyabinsk meteor penetrated the surface of Lake Chebarkul, creating an 8-meter diameter hole on 15 February 2013 || 
|-id=646
| 37646 Falconscott ||  || Robert Falcon Scott (1868–1912) was the first British explorer to reach the South Pole and explore Antarctica extensively by land. || 
|-id=655
| 37655 Illapa || 1994 PM || Illapa, the thunder or weather god of the Incas || 
|-id=678
| 37678 McClure ||  || Albert Edmund McClure (born 1938), Irish engineer and antique astronomical instrument restorer || 
|-id=683
| 37683 Gustaveeiffel || 1995 KK || Gustave Eiffel (1832–1923) was a French civil engineer and architect. He is best known for the Eiffel Tower, built for the 1889 Universal Exposition in Paris. || 
|-id=687
| 37687 Chunghikoh ||  || Chunghi Koh (Helen) Weber, American pharmacist and wife of American astronomer Robert Weber, who is credited with the discovery of this minor planet. || 
|-id=692
| 37692 Loribragg || 1995 VX || Lori Bragg, American member of the Maui Economic Development Board, provider of technical support to the AMOS team || 
|-id=699
| 37699 Santini-Aichl ||  || Jan Santini Aichel (1677–1723), a Czech architect of Italian origin || 
|}

37701–37800 

|-id=706
| 37706 Trinchieri || 1996 RN || Ginevra Trinchieri (born 1955) has worked on galaxies, groups, clusters and their evolution, particularly on their high energy properties. She is currently the president of the Italian Astronomical Society and the Italian representative and outreach contact in the IAU. || 
|-id=720
| 37720 Kawanishi ||  || Kawanishi is situated in the southern part of Yamagata Prefecture, Japan. || 
|-id=729
| 37729 Akiratakao ||  || Akira Takao (born 1952), Japanese neurological physician and amateur astronomer (nova hunter) || 
|-id=734
| 37734 Bonacina ||  || Celestino Bonacina (born 1947), an Italian amateur astronomer instrumental for the construction of the Sormano Astronomical Observatory where this minor planet was discovered. || 
|-id=735
| 37735 Riccardomuti || 1996 VL || Riccardo Muti (born 1941) is an Italian conductor. He holds three music directorships: the Chicago Symphony Orchestra; the Philadelphia Orchestra; and the Teatro alla Scala in Milan. Muti has been a prolific recording artist and has received dozens of honors, titles, awards and prizes. || 
|-id=736
| 37736 Jandl ||  || Ivan Jandl (1937–1987), a Czech child actor and first Czech Oscar winner || 
|-id=749
| 37749 Umbertobonori ||  || Umberto Bonori (born 1950) is an Italian amateur astronomer, who has been at the T.L.C. Observatory since its 1991 foundation. || 
|-id=782
| 37782 Jacquespiccard ||  || Jacques Piccard (1922–2008), a Swiss marine explorer best known for his historic submarine dive to the floor of the Mariana Trench. || 
|-id=786
| 37786 Tokikonaruko ||  || Tokiko Naruko, Japanese social volunteer, daughter of Issei Yamamoto, founder of the Oriental Astronomical Association || 
|-id=788
| 37788 Suchan ||  || Pavel Suchan, Czech popularizer of astronomy at the Stefanik Observatory in Prague and spokesman for the Czech Astronomical Society. || 
|}

37801–37900 

|-id=818
| 37818 Juliamaury ||  || Julia Maury (born 2019) is the daughter of (29634) Sabrinaaksil and (8184) Luderic, who is the son of (3780) Maury and (4404) Enirac. || 
|-id=835
| 37835 Darioconsigli ||  || Dario Consigli (born 1992), an Italian school teacher and nephew of amateur astronomer Maura Tombelli, who discovered this minor planet. || 
|-id=836
| 37836 Simoneterreni ||  || Simone Terreni (born 1972) is an Italian amateur astronomer and a member of the astronomy club at Montelupo who is a computer engineer and telecommunications entrepreneur by profession. || 
|-id=840
| 37840 Gramegna ||  || Maria Gramegna (1887–1915) was an Italian mathematician who studied linear differential equations. The techniques in his thesis, now lost, were highly original. She taught mathematics in Avezzano, and was one of 30000 people killed during the 1915 January 13 earthquake. || 
|-id=848
| 37848 Michelmeunier ||  || Michel Meunier (born 1964), a French airline pilot, amateur astronomer, and developer of electronic systems for astronomy, as well as a discoverer of minor planets and comets such as C/1997 J2 (Meunier–Dupouy) using a remote telescope in Chile. || 
|-id=853
| 37853 Danielbarbier ||  || Daniel Barbier (1907–1965), a French observational astronomer, made significant contributions to the study of the background of the night sky. He turned his interest to the 6300 Å forbidden line of neutral oxygen by measuring the variations of its strength with the height in the ionosphere where it is emitted. || 
|-id=859
| 37859 Bobkoff ||  || Robert Koff (born 1943), an American amateur astronomer who has produced numerous high-quality lightcurves for minor planets and eclipsing binary stars, despite shooting through the urban skies of Denver, CO, and around trees and houses from his apartment balcony. His work is a testament to perseverance, dedication and the power of CCD imaging (Src). || 
|-id=865
| 37865 Georgesattard ||  || Georges Attard (born 1957) is a French computer scientist and program manager in the aerospace industry. He has developed a number of image processing algorithms and has contributed to digital mapping and satellite imagery software. || 
|}

37901–38000 

|-id=939
| 37939 Hašler || 1998 HA || Karel Hašler (1879–1941), Czech songwriter, actor, movie director and cabaretier || 
|-id=941
| 37941 Dawidowicz ||  || Gilles Dawidowicz (born 1971), a French geographer and co-writer on planetology text books, who has been the vice-president of the Société astronomique de France as well as the president of the Triel Observatory (Src). || 
|}

References 

037001-038000